In military terms, 93rd Division or 93rd Infantry Division may refer to:

 93rd Infantry Division (German Empire)
 93rd Infantry Division (Wehrmacht)
 93rd Division (Imperial Japanese Army)
 U.S. 93rd Infantry Division